Anna Denisenko (born 14 October 1989) is a Belarusian  female footballer who plays for Zhytlobud-1 Kharkiv as a midfielder.

Career
She previously played for Nadezhda Mogilev. She first played the Champions League with Zhytlobud in the 2012–13 season.

With the Belarusian national team she played one match in the 2015 World Cup qualifiers.

Personal life
Denisenko has a twin sister Yulia who also plays for Zhytlobud.

References

1989 births
Living people
Belarusian women's footballers
Women's association football midfielders
Expatriate women's footballers in Ukraine
Belarusian expatriate sportspeople in Ukraine
WFC Zhytlobud-1 Kharkiv players
Belarus women's international footballers